Wayanad District has four types of administrative hierarchies: 
 Taluk and Village administration managed by the provincial government of Kerala
 Panchayath Administration managed by the local bodies
 Parliament Constituencies for the federal government of India
 Assembly Constituencies for the provincial government of Kerala

Administration of Wayanad

District Headquarters: Kalpetta. District Collector, District Police Chief and District Judge are based at Kalpetta.

Taluks of Wayanad

No. of Taluks: 3 
Vythiri(Headquarters: Kalpetta)
Sulthan Bathery
Mananthavady

Assembly Seats
No. of state Assembly Legislators: 3 
Kalpetta - Current MLA is Mr. T SIDIQ
Sulthan Bathery - Current MLA is Mr. I.C. Balakrishnan
Mananthavady - Current MLA is Mr.O.R.Kelu

Wayanad Parliament Constituency
Wayanad Lok Sabha constituency is one of twenty Lok Sabha (lower house of the Parliament of India) constituencies in Kerala state in southern India. Wayanad is a newly created constituency consisting of seven assembly constituency segments.

Assembly segments
Wayanad Lok Sabha constituency is composed of the following assembly segments:
Mananthavadi
Kalpetta
Sulthan Bathery
Thiruvambady
Nilambur
Wandoor
Eranad

Members of Parliament
2009: M. I. Shanavas, Indian National Congress. In the General Elections 2009 to the 15th Lok Sabha, Shri M.I. Shanavas of INC won the Wayanad  constituency. He defeated his nearest rival, Advocate M Rahmathulla of CPI by a margin of 153,439  votes. MI Shanavas secure 410,703 votes. M Rahmathulla secures 257,264 votes. K Muraleedharan of NCP secures 99,663 votes. MI Shanavas is a native of Neerettupuram, Alappuzha, and is KPCC general secretary. He entered politics through the Kerala Students Union and worked in the Youth Congress and Seva Dal. He was one of three leaders who rebelled against senior Congress leader K. Karunakaran and formed a third group. (The others were Ramesh Chennithala and G. Karthikeyan.) He contested unsuccessfully to Lok Sabha in 1999 and 2004. He also faced defeat in two assembly elections.

Indian general election, 2014

See also
 Indian general election, 2014 (Kerala)

References

Politics of Wayanad district